Adams Cable is a local cable television and Internet provider that serves northeast Pennsylvania along with rural Broome, Chenango and Delaware counties in New York.  Current products available are analog and digital cable television, HD television programming, echoes.net Broadband Internet service, and digital phone service.

Current systems
 Waymart, Pennsylvania – covers east Lackawanna County, PA and western Wayne County, PA.
 New Milford, Pennsylvania – covers eastern and northern Susquehanna County, PA and northern Wayne County, PA.
 Windsor, New York – covers rural Broome and Chenango counties in New York. Also covers the town of Deposit, NY.

External links

 Adams Cable

Cable television companies of the United States
American companies established in 1949
Companies based in Lackawanna County, Pennsylvania
1949 establishments in Pennsylvania